Thliptoceras gladialis is a moth in the family Crambidae. It was described by John Henry Leech in 1889. It is found in China in Fujian, Guangdong and Yunnan and in Taiwan.

The wingspan is 23–26 mm. The wings are greyish yellow, but more grey towards the termen in males. Females are deeper yellow with an orange tinge and a grey shade along the termen.

References

Moths described in 1889
Pyraustinae